Your Prize Story is an American television anthology that aired live on NBC from April 2, 1952 to May 28, 1952 on Wednesday nights at 10:00PM est. In a unique format the programs sponsor Hazel Bishop, requested that viewers submit story ideas to the show. The story had to be true and would be rewritten by the shows staff before airing. If the viewers story was used on the air, they received a $1,000 prize. The presentations were done with little scenery or props, similar to dinner theater.

References

1952 American television series debuts
1952 American television series endings
American live television series
NBC original programming
English-language television shows
1950s American anthology television series